Yayladalı is a village in the Gerger District, Adıyaman Province, Turkey. The village is populated by Kurds of the Mirdêsî tribe and had a population of 309 in 2021.

The hamlets of Kemerli, Oyalı and Soğanlı are attached to the village.

References

Villages in Gerger District
Kurdish settlements in Adıyaman Province